Štefan Harabin (born 4 May 1957) is a former Slovak judge and politician. He served as chief justice of the Supreme Court of Slovakia for two terms (1998–2003 and 2009–2014) and Minister of Justice from 2006 to 2009. In 2019 he ran unsuccessfully for President of Slovakia.

Judicial and political career 
Harabin graduated from the Faculty of Law, Pavol Jozef Šafárik University Košice. He started his judicial career as a probationary judge at the Košice regional court in 1980. Three years later, he became a professional judge at the Poprad district court. Harabin was a member of the Communist Party of Czechoslovakia until the Velvet Revolution of 1989. After the revolution, he continued to practice as a judge at the Košice regional court, until he was elected to the Supreme Court of Slovakia in 1991.

From 1998 to 2003, he was the chief justice of the Supreme Court and, in addition, president of the Judicial Council of Slovakia created in 2001. He served as minister of justice and deputy prime minister in Robert Fico's first cabinet from 4 July 2006 to 23 June 2009. He was nominated by the right-wing People's Party – Movement for a Democratic Slovakia (ĽS-HZDS), but was not formally a member of that party. Subsequently, he returned to his post of chief justice, serving until June 2014.

2019 Slovak presidential campaign 
Harabin ran as a non-partisan candidate in the 2019 Slovak presidential election. While nominally independent, he was endorsed by the extraparliamentary Christian Democracy – Life and Prosperity party. He ran on a platform of "traditional Slovak culture based on Christianity and family, formed by a man–father and woman–mother" and rejecting "gender ideology".

During the campaign he accused Muslim migrants of "killing and raping European women in Germany and France" and claimed his opponents wanted to destroy Slovak culture. He also condemned NATO, European Union institutions as well as homosexuals. According to Globsec, Harabin was the most favoured candidate by "pro-Kremlin disinformation channels" on Facebook, receiving 174 positive and no negative posts.

Harabin finished third, winning 14.3% of votes.

Arrest 
On 16 May 2022, Harabin was arrested by the Slovak police in connection to  "approval of Russia's attack on Ukraine".

References

External links
http://www.sme.sk/c/4877475/harabin-hrozi-vydavatelom.html
http://tvnoviny.sk/spravy/domace/sudcovia-ziadaju-aby-us-zrusil-volbu-harabina.html

1957 births
Living people
People from Kežmarok District
People's Party – Movement for a Democratic Slovakia politicians
Justice ministers of Slovakia
Candidates for President of Slovakia
Communist Party of Czechoslovakia politicians
Slovak judges
20th-century Slovak lawyers